Satyana is a female given name. From Sanskrit, Satyana means "truth" or "true". It is pronounced SAHT-ya-na. Nickname is Saša.

List of people with the given name Satyana 
Satyana Marie Denisof, eldest daughter of actors Alyson Hannigan and Alexis Denisof.

External links 
Satyana in Behind the Name
Satyana in Babynames World
Satyana in Babynamespedia

Indian feminine given names